The Agiashvili is a Georgian noble family, whose roots can be traced back to the 12th century. The members were entitled as the joint-High Constables of the Kingdom of Imereti, and held the key fortress of Ts'uts'khvat'i near Kutaisi in western Georgia. After the Russian annexation of Imereti, they were received among the princely nobility of the Empire in 1850.

References 

Noble families of Georgia (country)
Russian noble families
Georgian-language surnames